U.S. Route 9W (US 9W) is a north–south United States Numbered Highway in the states of New Jersey and New York. It begins in Fort Lee, New Jersey, as Fletcher Avenue crosses the US 1/9, US 46, and Interstate 95 (I-95) approaches to the George Washington Bridge, and heads north up the west side of the Hudson River to US 9 in Albany, New York. As its "W" suffix indicates, US 9W is a westerly alternate route of US 9 between the two locations. US 9W directly serves three cities—Newburgh, Kingston, and Albany—and enters the vicinity of several others. As the route heads north, it connects to several highways of regional importance, including I-84, US 209, New York State Route 23 (NY 23), and US 20. Much of US 9W parallels the New York State Thruway and NY 32; additionally, the latter overlaps with US 9W in four different locations.

Route description

For much of its length, US 9W is a two-lane surface road. However, some stretches in New Jersey and New York widen to four lanes, and much of the highway in Orange County is like an expressway even if not so designated.

New Jersey

US 9W begins as a four lane road. Heading north on Fletcher Avenue (from Kelby Street intersection, near the George Washington Bridge) in Fort Lee, US 9W occupies the right-of-way of the Palisades Interstate Parkway (PIP) to Lemoine Avenue, the northern terminus of Route 67. US 9W exits the right-of-way, turning north onto Lemoine Avenue, later Sylvan Avenue, in Englewood Cliffs, where it passes the headquarters of Ferrari of North America, Unilever, and CNBC. As the roadway enters Tenafly from Englewood Cliffs, it reduces to a two lane roadway from four lanes. It continues to parallel the PIP to its west as they progress northward along the west bank of the Hudson River until reaching the border with New York. Both roads run very near the top of the Palisades, occasionally offering views of New York City and the river.

Lemoine Avenue is heavy with commercial development in the Coytesville section of Fort Lee, but, as the road runs into Englewood Cliffs, it transitions to corporate office buildings. Into the affluent community of Alpine in the state's northeastern corner, it becomes more residential. Near Norwood, just south of the state line, US 9W crosses under the parkway and enters New York.  Before the construction of the PIP, US 9W used to follow a route through the State Line Lookout at the New Jersey–New York border which is now accessible only from the parkway.

The entire route of US 9W in New Jersey is within Bergen County.

New York

Rockland County
Across the state line, US 9W continues in Palisades as Highland Avenue, a two-lane road through mostly residential suburban surroundings. It passes Columbia University's Lamont–Doherty Earth Observatory and then Tallman Mountain State Park. Bending westward to Sparkill, it meets NY 340.

It returns to the riverside at Piermont, where it takes the name Broadway Avenue. Running due north, it enters Nyack and meets with the New York State Thruway (I-87 and I-287) just west of the Tappan Zee Bridge. It then runs along the thruway to the east terminus of NY 59 in downtown Nyack, where it becomes North Highland Avenue once again. North of Upper Nyack, it passes Rockland Lake through Valley Cottage and then Rockland Lake State Park.

Alongside the park, it crosses town lines again. NY 303 reaches its north end just after the park and, after a tight curve NY 304, reaches its northern terminus as well.

US 9W then returns to the riverside briefly, trending away from it into Haverstraw under the name Congers Avenue. The village is followed immediately by West Haverstraw, where US 202 comes in at an oblique angle and joins US 9W, creating the first concurrency along the route.

The combined highways head north from the Haverstraws as South, then North, Liberty Drive, passing Stony Point Battlefield. They return to the Hudson at Tomkins Cove, where the Hudson River National Defense Reserve Fleet was moored from 1947 to 1971. Between Tomkins Cove and Jones Point there are two large ships anchor surrounding a monument alongside the road that marks the spot which is just across from Indian Point Energy Center in Buchanan.

At Jones Point, the road curves and bends above the river as it works its way around Dunderberg Mountain, the southernmost peak of the Hudson Highlands and part of Bear Mountain State Park.

At Iona Island, it levels out again briefly and then US 9W/US 202 climbs to the heart of the state park at Bear Mountain Inn and Hessian Lake, where the Appalachian Trail crosses beneath the road in the only artificial tunnel along its entire route. The Orange County line is crossed just before Bear Mountain Circle.

Orange County

The circle marks the northern terminus of the PIP and the junction with US 6. US 202 leaves US 9W to join US 6 here and cross the Bear Mountain Bridge. North of the circle, US 9W continues as an undivided four-lane road, crossing Popolopen Creek and affording views of the similarly named Torne. It passes first the historic Fort Montgomery, then enters the small hamlet of the same name, distinguished by a post office, gas station, and some other small businesses.

A half-mile further north, NY 218 (Storm King Highway), the former route of US 9W, forks off to the right, carrying traffic to Highland Falls and the U.S. Military Academy (USMA) at West Point. At this point, US 9W becomes a divided limited-access highway as it starts to climb the highlands above the village and the academy. The first exit is NY 218, which joins US 9W for  just north of the village. It leaves the highway at the northern terminus of NY 293 to run alongside Storm King Mountain.

From here, US 9W continues its ascent, offering sweeping views over the river and highlands, with an overlook available to northbound drivers. The surrounding land is all woods, part of the vast USMA property. After passing Crow's Nest, Storm King and the rocky cliff faces of Butter Hill dominate the northward view. Another parking lot allows travelers to stop and sightsee, as well as hike the Stillman Trail up the two peaks.

After Storm King, the road begins a long descent into the town of Cornwall. Just outside the village of Cornwall-on-Hudson and the fields of New York Military Academy, NY 218 ends its loop. Shortly afterward, the division ends and grade intersections resume, although the road remains four lanes as it enters the town of New Windsor.

It descends again where Breakneck Ridge and Bull Hill tower across the river. Traffic begins to slow down at the center of town, where NY 94 ends its journey across the county. After this traffic light, the road begins to narrow. Once across Quassaick Creek and into Newburgh, it is Robinson Avenue, a wide urban arterial with parking along the sides.

It ascends gently past Delano-Hitch Stadium and the associated park to the center of its passage across Newburgh, the intersection with Broadway. Here NY 17K has its eastern terminus, and NY 32, the other main surface route west of the Hudson, begins its first concurrency with US 9W.

Passing Broadway School, a former elementary school which is in the process of being converted into the City of Newburgh Court House, the two routes head into a more residential sector of the city, marked by Frederick Law Olmsted-designed Downing Park. The road's climb continues until the North campus of Newburgh Free Academy, where it starts to descend to the busy exit at I-84, visible ahead, just west of the Newburgh–Beacon Bridge. This junction, also including NY 52, is the city's northern limit.

Immediately after it, NY 32 leaves to the northwest while US 9W continues northward. It passes Powelton Club, part of the affluent community of Balmville, the first of several within the town of Newburgh that US 9W will pass. Middle Hope follows, as the road becomes a two-lane route with a rural feel. Development continues along the road, but there are increasingly large unbroken fields or woodlots and, finally, in the northern reaches of the town, orchards. At Roseton, past the access road to the nearby powerplants, the highway reaches the county line just past the turnoff to the Gomez Mill House, the earliest surviving Jewish home in the U.S.

Ulster County
Traffic is slowed when it passes through the hamlet of Marlboro, but otherwise there is little change in US 9W until it widens to four lanes again just south of the Mid-Hudson Bridge approach overpass. At this point, US 44 and NY 55 join the highway from the east. The road becomes a busy commercial strip for the next mile to the concurrency's end, where NY 44 and NY 55 go down into Highland. The four lanes continue, however, for several more miles until well past the eastern terminus of NY 299, the road that carries traffic west toward the thruway and New Paltz.

It becomes more built up at Port Ewen, just south of Kingston, which it enters by crossing Rondout Creek via the John T. Loughran Bridge and becoming Frank Koenig Boulevard and four lanes with limited access.

It runs right through Kingston this way and meets NY 32 again at the city's northern boundary. The road widens again, becoming a busy commercial strip. At the freeway interchange ahead for the Kingston–Rhinecliff Bridge, US 209 comes to its northern end and NY 199 its western.

In Lake Katrine, the road begins to narrow and traffic lightens. US 9W stays on a straight northward course, following alongside Esopus Creek but not crossing it, until it veers northeast to merge, once again, with NY 32.

This third concurrency finally brings the road over Esopus Creek and into the riverside village of Saugerties. Here, US 9W follows Partition Street and then Main Street when the routes part again, with NY 32 carrying NY 212 out of this junction. As Malden Avenue, the highway continues north alongside the river once again, passing through the hamlet of Malden-on-Hudson on its way up into Greene County.

Greene County and north

In Coxsackie, US 9W meets this time with the northern terminus of NY 385, as well as the eastern terminus of NY 81. In West Coxsackie, US 9W meets with the New York State Thruway (I-87). Further north, the route meets NY 144, and in the village of Ravena, it meets NY 143.

NY 396 meets US 9W in Selkirk. After briefly joining with NY 32 again, US 9W meets I-787 south of Albany. Immediately thereafter, NY 443 joins US 9W until Madison Avenue (US 20), where NY 443 ends. US 9W, however, continues on, meeting with NY 5 (junction not signed on NY 5) before ending at US 9 (Clinton Avenue).

History

Origins
In New York, much of what is now US 9W was designated as Route 3, an unsigned legislative route, by the New York State Legislature in 1908. The route extended from the New Jersey state line at Orangetown and went northward through the Hudson Valley to the city of Albany. Route 3 broke from modern US 9W in several locations, mostly in areas where the route has since been moved onto bypasses. In Clarkstown, Route 3 veered west to serve Congers via Lake and Old Haverstraw Roads. From Highland Falls to Cornwall-on-Hudson, Route 3 followed modern NY 218 around Storm King Mountain. Lastly, Route 3 utilized current NY 385 between Catskill and Coxsackie. This route north of Route 3 was altered slightly on March 1, 1921, to bypass Congers on modern US 9W. When the first set of posted routes in New York were assigned in 1924, all of legislative Route 3 south of Ravena was designated as part of NY 10. From Ravena to Albany, however, NY 10 followed a more easterly alignment along what is now NY 143, NY 144, and NY 32. This route had previously been signed as part of the West Shore Route auto trail north of Newburgh.

The New Jersey segment of modern US 9W was originally designated as part of Route 18N in 1923, a route that ran from Hoboken to the New York state line at Alpine via Fort Lee. In the 1927 New Jersey state highway renumbering, Route 18N was truncated northward to Fort Lee. At the time, present-day County Route 501 (CR 501) north of Fort Lee was part of Route 1. In 1929, Route 18N was supplanted by a realigned Route 1. The Route 1 designation remained in place until the 1953 New Jersey state highway renumbering when it was removed to eliminate overlaps with several routes, including US 9W.

Designation

In the original 1925 plan for the U.S. Numbered Highway System, US 9 was designated along the west bank of the Hudson River from Fort Lee to Albany, utilizing Route 18N in New Jersey and NY 10 in New York. The alignment of US 9 in northern New Jersey and New York remained unchanged in the final system alignment approved on November 11, 1926. However, when US 9 was commissioned in 1927, it was split into two branches between Bergen County, New Jersey, and Waterford, New York. The west branch began in Ridgefield and continued to the New York state line on modern Route 93 and CR 501, bypassing Fort Lee to the west. At the state line, the west branch of US 9 became US 9W and followed a short piece of what is now NY 340 to Sparkill.

Past Sparkill, US 9W used what was originally planned as US 9 north to Waterford, utilizing modern NY 32 from Albany to Waterford. The east branch of US 9 initially followed Route 5 east from Ridgefield to Edgewater, where it followed the Edgewater Ferry to the New York state line in the Hudson River. The branch resumed at the northern New York City line as US 9E and continued to Waterford on what is now US 9 and US 4 along the eastern side of the river. At Waterford, the two branches converged and continued north toward the Canada–U.S. border as a unified US 9.

Early changes
The two branches of US 9 in New Jersey were altered several times over the next decade. At some point between 1927 and 1929, the west branch of US 9 was reconfigured in Bergen County to enter Fort Lee from the south on Palisade Avenue (current Route 67) and proceed north from Fort Lee to New York on Route 18N (later Route 1). The portion of US 9W in New York south of Sparkill was altered accordingly to meet the realigned US 9. In the early 1930s, the east branch of US 9 was shifted southward to reach New York via modern Route 139 and the Holland Tunnel while the west branch of the route was realigned to follow what is now US 1/9 between the Tonnele Circle and Fort Lee. US 9W was extended southward into New Jersey , replacing the west branch of US 9. US 9 was rerouted  to follow US 9W and the George Washington Bridge to New York; as a result, US 9W was cut back to its current southern terminus in Fort Lee.

In the 1930 renumbering of state highways in New York, US 9W was truncated southward to end in Albany while US 9E was redesignated as just US 9 and reconfigured to bypass Waterford to the west in favor of a direct alignment between Albany and Round Lake. At the same time, US 9W was realigned through New Baltimore and Coeymans to use modern NY 144 instead. The portion of what is now US 9W from New Baltimore to Albany was originally designated as NY 144 as part of the 1930 renumbering while the segment from Catskill to Coxsackie was assigned NY 385 . The alignments of US 9W and NY 385 were swapped by the following year while the routings of US 9W and NY 144 were flipped in April 1935

Bypasses
In the early 1930s, plans were made by the state of New York to construct a new highway between the Bear Mountain Bridge and Cornwall-on-Hudson that would bypass both Cornwall-on-Hudson and Highland Falls and bypass the narrow Storm King Highway, US 9W's original routing between the two. On April 8, 1934, three people were killed by a rockslide on the Storm King Highway, expediting plans for the new highway, known as the Storm King Cutoff. The southernmost  of the highway—from the bridge to just north of Fort Montgomery—utilized the existing right-of-way of US 9W, which was widened from two to four lanes and straightened through the construction of rock cuts. Construction on this segment was completed in 1937.

The portion of the bypass from Fort Montgomery to Cornwall-on-Hudson, with the exception of a  stretch northwest of Highland Falls, was constructed on a new alignment. It was built with four lanes and constructed along the sides of Storm King Mountain and other, smaller hills in the area. The high elevation of the roadway gave rise to a bevy of scenic, panoramic views that stretched for several miles into the distance; as a result, a fifth lane was added in some areas to allow motorists to stop and view the scenery. Like the section south of Fort Montgomery, the  stretch that utilized the original US 9W was widened to four lanes as well. Several interchanges were built along the route, including with NY 293 and NY 307. The cutoff was opened to traffic from Fort Montgomery to NY 293 sometime in 1939 or 1940 and to Angola Road (CR 9) on September 26, 1940. The last section, from Angola Road north to Blooming Grove Turnpike north of Cornwall-on-Hudson, was opened to traffic on May 31, 1941. US 9W was realigned to follow the cutoff while its old route via the Storm King Highway became NY 218.

Bypasses have also been proposed or constructed in other locations. In Kingston, US 9W was originally routed on Wurts Street, McEntee Street, Broadway, and East Chester Street. An easterly bypass of the city between Wurts Street and NY 32 was constructed in the late 1970s and completed as a realignment of US 9W by 1981. The portion of US 9W's former alignment south of Abeel Street in Kingston became NY 984D, an unsigned reference route. In Albany, the north end of US 9W and part of US 9 would have been rerouted onto a proposed limited-access highway called the Mid-Crosstown Arterial. The project was eventually canceled.

Major intersections

See also

List of reference routes in New York

References

External links

An enlarged view of road jurisdiction at the Fort Lee approaches to the George Washington Bridge (PDF)
New Jersey Roads: US 9W
US 9W @ NYS Thruway Exit 10 (Empire State Roads.com)
US 9W @ NYS Thruway Exit 11 (Empire State Roads.com)
Capital Highways -- Mid-Crosstown Arterial
Police Scanner Frequencies for Route 9W
Speed Limits for Route 9W in New Jersey

 
Transportation in Bergen County, New Jersey
Transportation in Rockland County, New York
Transportation in Orange County, New York
09W
09W
09W
Hudson River
Limited-access roads in New York (state)
Transportation in Ulster County, New York
Transportation in Greene County, New York
Transportation in Albany County, New York